Moshe Mishaelof (born September 14, 1983) is a former Israeli professional football (soccer).

Honours
Source

Maccabi Tel Aviv
Israeli Youth Championship (2):
2000–01, 2001–02
Youth State Cup (1):
2001
Israeli Premier League (1):
2002–03
State Cup (1):
2005
Toto Cup (1):
2008–09
Mishalof played in the youth department of Maccabi Tel Aviv, and was captain of the youth team in the years 2000-2002. Mishalof won two championships and one cup with the youth team, rose to the senior team in 2002 and won the championship with her in the 2002/2003 season. Mishalof was included in the squad of Maccabi Tel Aviv as part of its games in the Champions League. In the 2004/2005 season he won the State Cup with his team, and in the 2008/2009 season he won the Toto Cup with her.

In June 2009 Mishalof signed with Apollon Limassol from the Cypriot Premier League, and in January 2010 he moved to the Paphos team.
Mishalof remained in Leumit and in the 2017/2018 season played for Hapoel Ramat Hasharon. In his retirement season, Mishalof played for Hapoel Umm al-Fahm in the first division, and after helping it qualify for the national league, he retired from active play at the age of 35.

In May 2019, at the end of a selection process in which 12 candidates were examined, Mishalof was elected to the position of director general (CEO)of the Israel Football Players Association [2].

Mishalof is studying at the Ono Academic Campus for a bachelor's degree in education and society, with a specialization in sports [3].

References

Footnotes

1983 births
Living people
Israeli footballers
Maccabi Tel Aviv F.C. players
Apollon Limassol FC players
AEP Paphos FC players
Beitar Jerusalem F.C. players
Hapoel Acre F.C. players
Hapoel Nir Ramat HaSharon F.C. players
Hapoel Umm al-Fahm F.C. players
Israeli expatriate footballers
Expatriate footballers in Cyprus
Israeli expatriate sportspeople in Cyprus
Israeli Premier League players
Cypriot First Division players
Israel under-21 international footballers
Footballers from Tel Aviv
Association football midfielders